The Suishintai was the paramilitary youth wing of the Jawa Hōkōkai (ジャワ奉公会, "Javanese Service Society") which was formed in August 1944 by its leader Sukarno, alongside Soediro, Moewardi, Soeroso, Oto Iskandar di Nata, and Boentaran Martoatmodjo. Members of the Suishintai did not wear a special uniform like military units, instead wearing a badge of a bull's head in a circle that was attached to the left side of the chest. At the end of 1945, this so-called lascar had approximately 60,000 youth members, a number that could only be matched and beaten by the socialist Pesindo, the Barisan Hizbullah of the Masyumi Party, and the Lasjkar Rakjat of the Murba Party. Following the Proclamation of Indonesian Independence, the Suishintai was renamed to Barisan Banteng ("Bulls Front"). The corps was mobilized to hear speeches from nationalist leaders. In addition, they were trained in the mobilization of large crowds, strengthening of military defenses, and in carrying out activities for the well-being of the people.

Formation
In mid-1944, a session of the Central Advisory Council took place. One of the decisions taken was to formulate a way to foster Indonesian nationalism and strengthen society to prevent direct or indirect attacks from the enemy. On this basis, the Empire of Japan ordered the formation of the Suishintai. Because at that time Indonesia was officially still the Dutch East Indies under Japanese occupation, this new organization supported the Japanese war effort against the Allies under the pretext of defending Indonesian society. The corps thrived in urban areas. Its main activity was the military training of its members with simple tools, such as wooden rifles (mokujū) and bamboo spears. Membership of the Suishintai was heterogeneous and consisted of various youth groups; the educated, the under-educated, and those without any education. From this system, it was hoped that solidarity furthered the unity and integrity of the corps.

See also
 Central Advisory Council
 Collaboration with the Axis powers
 Indonesian National Revolution
 Japanese occupation of the Dutch East Indies

References

Indonesian collaborators with Imperial Japan
Indonesian National Revolution
Japanese occupation of the Dutch East Indies
Military units and formations of Imperial Japan